The following is a list of major snow and ice events in the United States that have caused noteworthy damage and destruction in their wake. The categories presented below are not used to measure the strength of a storm, but are rather indicators of how severely the snowfall affected the population in the storm's path. Some information such as snowfall amounts or lowest pressure may be unavailable due to a lack of documentation. Winter storms can produce both ice and snow, but are usually more notable in one of these two categories. The "Maximum accumulation" sections reflect the more notable category which is represented in inches of snow unless otherwise stated. Only category 1 and higher storms as defined by their regional snowfall index are included here.

Note: A blizzard is defined as having sustained winds of at least 35 mph for three hours or more.

Seasonal summaries
The following is a table that shows North American winter season summaries dating back to 2009. While there is no well-agreed-upon date used to indicate the start of winter in the Northern Hemisphere, there are two definitions of winter which may be used. The first is astronomical winter, which has the season starting on a date known as the winter solstice, often on or around December 21. The season lasts until the spring equinox, which often occurs on or around March 20. The second has to do with meteorological winter which varies with latitude for a start date. Winter is often defined by meteorologists to be the three calendar months with the lowest average temperatures. Since both definitions span the start of the calendar year, it is possible to have a winter storm occur two different years.

18th–19th century

20th century

21st century

2000s

2010s

2020s

See also

 List of blizzards
 List of Regional Snowfall Index Category 5 winter storms
 List of Regional Snowfall Index Category 4 winter storms
 List of Northeast Snowfall Impact Scale winter storms
 Winter storm naming in the United States

Notes

References

Blizzards in the United States
Lists of disasters in the United States
Winter weather events in the United States
Weather-related lists